Grade most commonly refers to:
 Grading in education, a measurement of a student's performance
 Grade, the number of the year a student has reached in a given educational stage
 Grade (slope), the steepness of a slope

Grade or grading may also refer to:

Music
 Grade (music), a formally assessed level of profiency in a musical instrument
 Grade (band), punk rock band
 Grades (producer), British electronic dance music producer and DJ

Science and technology

Biology and medicine
 Grading (tumors), a measure of the aggressiveness of a tumor in medicine
 The Grading of Recommendations Assessment, Development and Evaluation (GRADE) approach
 Evolutionary grade, a paraphyletic group of organisms

Geology 
 Graded bedding, a description of the variation in grain size through a bed in a sedimentary rock
 Metamorphic grade, an indicatation of the degree of metamorphism of rocks
 Ore grade, a measure that describes the concentration of a valuable natural material in the surrounding ore

Engineering and technology
 Grade (fasteners), the grade of nuts and bolts refers to the strength and material
 Grading (earthworks), the preparation and leveling of land for construction, especially of roads and railways
 Grade separation, aligning a junction of two or more transport axes at different heights to facilitate traffic flow
 Cetane rating, a measure of diesel fuel's combustion quality
 Octane rating, also called gasoline grade, the measure of the autoignition resistance of gasoline (petrol) and other fuels used in spark-ignition internal combustion engines
 Grade of service, the quality of voice service in telecommunications
 Color grading, the process of altering and enhancing the color of a motion picture, video image, or still image
 A rating of lumber (timber) quality and strength

Mathematics
 Grade (angle), a unit for the measurement of plane angles
 Graded (mathematics), with several meanings
 Graded poset, a  partially ordered set equipped with a rank function, sometimes called a ranked poset
 Graded vector space, a vector space with an extra piece of structure
 Graded algebra, an algebra over a field (or ring) with an extra piece of structure

Linguistics
 Grade, each of the "levels" of vowel gradation, especially in Indo-European
 Grade, or degree, one of the comparative forms of an adjective

Sport
 Grade (climbing), a climber's assessment of the difficulty and danger of climbing a hill
 Grade (bouldering), a climber's assessment of the difficulty and danger of climbing a route which are distinct from those used in regular climbing
 Degree of difficulty, in several sports
 International Scale of River Difficulty, also called grade, a standardized scale used to rate the safety of a stretch of river, or a single rapid

Other uses
 Grade (crime), the degree of seriousness of a crime
 Military rank
 Grade (surname) (includes a list of people with the name)
 Grade, Cornwall, a village in the UK
 Coin grading, the process of determining the grade or condition of a coin, the key factor in its value
 Food grading, the inspection, assessment and sorting of foods to determine quality, freshness, legal conformity and market value
 Pattern grading, the scaling of a pattern to a different size in the clothing or footwear industry

See also 
 Gradient
 Gradation (disambiguation)
 Rank (disambiguation)
 Rating (disambiguation)